Jacob Smith House is a historic home located at West Hills in Suffolk County, New York. It consists of a three-bay, -story saltbox built about 1740 and a five-bay, -story dwelling with a shed roof wing added about 1830.

The house is located within West Hills County Park. It was added to the National Register of Historic Places in 1985.

References

Houses on the National Register of Historic Places in New York (state)
Houses completed in 1740
Houses in Suffolk County, New York
National Register of Historic Places in Suffolk County, New York